An incomplete list of films produced in Brazil in the 1950s. For an alphabetical list of films currently on Wikipedia see :Category:Brazilian films

External links
  Brazilian film at the Internet Movie Database

1950s
Brazilian
Films